Rocky Mount Central City Historic District is a national historic district located at Rocky Mount, Edgecombe County and Nash County, North Carolina. The district encompasses 166 contributing buildings in central Rocky Mount.  It includes a variety of industrial, commercial, residential, and institutional buildings dating from the late-19th through mid-20th centuries. Notable buildings include the Firestation No. 2 (1924), Union Bus Station (1951), the Railway Express Agency Building (c. 1930), Memorial Hospital (1937), Church of the Good Shepherd (1877), Atlantic Coastline Railroad Station (1903-1916), Imperial Tobacco Company Processing Plant (1903-1923), S. H. Kress and Company (c. 1913), Belk-Tyler (c. 1905, 1915, 1920, 1945), Grand Theater (c. 1912, 1930s), Manhattan Theater (c. 1935), Holy Hope Episcopal Church (1910s), and Summerlin House (1895).

It was listed on the National Register of Historic Places in 1980, with a boundary increase / decrease in 2009.

References

Historic districts on the National Register of Historic Places in North Carolina
Neoclassical architecture in North Carolina
Queen Anne architecture in North Carolina
Modern Movement architecture in the United States
Buildings and structures in Edgecombe County, North Carolina
National Register of Historic Places in Edgecombe County, North Carolina
Buildings and structures in Nash County, North Carolina
National Register of Historic Places in Nash County, North Carolina